Milton on Stour is a small village in North Dorset, England.  It lies on the River Stour, a mile north of the town of Gillingham.

The Church of St Simon and St Jude, built in 1868, is a Grade II listed building.

References

External links 

Villages in Dorset
Gillingham, Dorset